Mary Dunlop Maclean (pseudonym, Judith Herz; September 27, 1873 – July 12, 1912) was a writer, journalist, and first managing editor of The Crisis from 1909 until her death.

Early life
Mary Dunlop Johnson was born to white parents Harriet Darling Johnson and Samuel Otis Johnson in Nassau, Bahamas, September 27, 1873. Her mother, a descendant of Revolutionary War hero Paul Dudley Sargent and of Governor John Winthrop, was born in Maine; her father was born in Nassau to American parents. She was sent to Boston, Massachusetts as a teenager to complete her education.

Career
In 1907, Maclean edited a collection of Abraham Lincoln's letters and speeches. Soon after, Maclean volunteered as managing editor of The Crisis beginning in 1909, working with W. E. B. DuBois as an editor, after the First National Negro Conference. She was the only woman on the magazine's initial six-person editorial board. She used her skills as a journalist to conduct interviews and report to the NAACP on a lynching in Coatesville, Pennsylvania.

She was, simultaneously, on the Sunday staff at the New York Times, writing features such as a report from Sicily after the 1908 Messina earthquake. She used the pseudonym "Judith Herz" for at least one article in The New Era (a profile of the Yiddish-language playwright, Jacob Gordin).

Personal life
Maclean died from complications following surgery in 1912. She was 38 years old. The staff of The Crisis established a memorial fund in her name, used to fund publications of the NAACP. Mary White Ovington chaired the memorial committee.

References

1873 births
1912 deaths
American women journalists
American women writers
People from Nassau, Bahamas
Pseudonymous women writers
20th-century pseudonymous writers